R.E.S.O.R.T. (stylized as R•E•S•O•R•T) is the tenth studio album by Japanese Jazz fusion band T-Square, who was then called The Square. It was released on April 1, 1985 under Columbia Records. This was the last studio album with drummer Tohru Hasebe, who would leave the band after the tour (and the band's second live video album The Square Live that same year). Hiroyuki Noritake would replace him in the next album.

Track listing
Sources

Personnel
Sources
T-Square
Hirotaka Izumi - Keyboards
Masahiro Andoh - Guitars
Takeshi Itoh - Alto Saxophone, Lyricon
Tohru Hasebe - Drums and Percussion
Toyoyuki Tanaka - Electric and Synthesizer Bass

Additional musicians (on "Feel Alright", "Stimulator" and "In the Grid")
Bill Reichenbach - Trombone, Bass Trombone 
Gary Grant - Trumpet, Flugelhorn
Jerry Hey - Trumpet, Flugelhorn
Larry Williams - Tenor Saxophone

References

1985 albums
T-Square (band) albums